Heinz Hügelshofer (25 March 1919 – 10 August 1994) was a Swiss speed skater. He competed in the men's 5000 metres event at the 1948 Winter Olympics.

References

External links
  

1919 births
1994 deaths
Swiss male speed skaters
Olympic speed skaters of Switzerland
Speed skaters at the 1948 Winter Olympics